Komal Aziz is a Pakistani television actress known for her role in Ishq-e-Benaam for which she was nominated for Best Soap Actress at Hum Awards. She is also known for her leading role in  Bharosa Pyar Tera , Bisaat-e-Dil. And raaz e ulfat

Life and career 
In an interview at talkshow Rewind with Samina Peerzada, Aziz said that she comes from a middle-class family and that after completing her A levels, she got enrolled in IBA Karachi and was suspended from University for three years after she was caught cheating. She talked about the flaws in the local education system which is majorly based on rote-learning. Despite the huge downfall, she motivated herself and applied in another institution Lahore University of Management Sciences where she got accepted with 75 percent scholarship. Other than that, she also got an above 100 percent scholarship at a university in Michigan, USA, where she completed her undergraduate degree in Business and Economics.

Television

References

External links 

Living people
People from Karachi
Pakistani television actresses
Lahore University of Management Sciences alumni
Year of birth missing (living people)